Against Wind and Tide: A Cuban Odyssey is a 1981 American documentary film about the Mariel boatlift. It was first broadcast on PBS' WORLD the week of June 1, 1981.

Awards
Against Wind and Tide was nominated for the Academy Award for Best Documentary Feature.

Against Wind and Tide won a CINE Golden Eagle.

References

External links

1981 television films
1981 films
1981 documentary films
American documentary television films
Cuban emigrants
Documentary films about Cuba
Documentary films about immigration to the United States
Documentary films about refugees
1980s English-language films
1980s American films